Liebe ist ... 2 (Love Is...2) is the twenty-first studio album released by German Schlager group Die Flippers. Compared to their previous three releases, this album was a moderate success. As with Liebe ist ..., it contained only cover versions of well-known oldies.

Track listing
 "Good-bye Eloisa"
 "Angie"
 "Sie war ein Kind der Sonne" ("She Was A Child of the Sun")
 "Septemberwind" ("September Wind")
 "Melodie D'Amour"
 "Stern von San Fernando" ("Star From San Fernando")
 "Tränen die der Wind verweht" ("Tears That the Wind Blows Away")
 "Bella Bianca"
 "Sommerträume" ("Summer Dreams")
 "Weisse Taube, Paloma"
 "Moonlight Lady"
 "Der Himmell hat Dich für mich erdacht" ("The Sky Demised You For Me")
 "Fernando's Traum" ("Fernando's Dream")
 "Wenn Dein Herz friert" ("When Your Heart Freezes")
 "Schuld war die Sommernacht auf Hawaii" ("The Summer Wind in Hawaii Is At Fault")
 "San Marino bei Nacht" ("San Marino at Night")

Personnel
Olaf Malolepski - guitars, lead vocals
Bernd Hengst - bass guitar, vocals
Manfred Durban - percussion, vocals

1991 albums
Die Flippers albums
German-language albums